Ahmed bin Tayeb bin Salem al-Debaisi or simply Ahmed bin Salem was an Algerian Sufi, commander, and warrior mostly known for commanding the Kabyle Zwawa resistance in the Emirate of Abdelkader.

Origins 
Ahmed bin Salem was born between 1798, and 1807, in Aïn Bessem. His father was called "Al-Tayeb", and was one of the descendants of the Algerian Sufi, Sidi Salem bin Makhlouf. He was part of the Beni Jaad tribe, one of the seven tribe surrounding the Dar-Es-Soltan of the Deylik of Algiers.

Description 
Ahmed bin Salem was average height (around 171 cm). He had a black beard and eyes, white skin, and he was noted to be religious, and wise. He proved his loyalty through many sacrifices, and was noted to be courageous, and skilled in horse riding.

Abdelkader's tours, and his appointment 
Following the Treaty of Tafna the Emirate of Abdelkader began expanding to the east through signing alliances, and gaining the loyalty of local tribes. In late 1837, Abdelkader toured Kabylia, where the local tribes gave him a warm welcome. He warned the already cautious tribes about the French expansion into their homeland, and talked with many of the local chiefs, one of them being Ahmed bin Salem. Abdelkader recognized his virtue and intelligence, and asked him for support in the future.

The area of Bouïra, was at the time still in the hands of the local tribes, such as the Beni Jaad, which resisted the French conquest. Initially serving the Algerine army under Ibrahim Agha, these tribes found themselves isolated from other Algerian resistances, such as the Beylik of Constantine or the Beylik of Titteri. In 1837, a few months before the treaty of tafna, France successfully defeated these local tribes in the Thénia expedition. As such, the promises of Abdelkader to unify the Algerian tribes, and lead a successful war of liberation against the kafir invaders sounded very much promising. Abdelkader gave a speech to the locals, and in the end, they all pledged allegiance to him. He appointed Ahmed to lead the local district.

The district's organization 
The district was further organized into four Aghaliks, each led by an Agha.

War against France

Mitidja Campaign 
In 1839 the war between Algeria and France rebegun. Ahmed bin Salem, with other commanders, Mohammed Allel, and Muhammad bin Isa al-Barakani started a campaign against France, and the tribes loyal to France in the Mitidja plains. The campaign was initially extremely successful, and caused several thousand hostile casualties. The Algerian forces were forced to retreat after a French victory at Oued El Alleug where the Algerian lost several hundred troops. The battle was Tactically a French victory, since they forced the Algerian armies to retreat, but it was a strategic victory for the Algerians since they slaughtered several thousand French troops and French-friendly tribes, and overall weakened the French war efforts around Algiers.

Battle of Ammal 
Following the retreat from Mitidja, Ahmed decided to fortify the mountains of Khemis El-Khechna, and Bani Omran to monitor French movements in the region, and launch raids against French troops and settlers. The French in turn attacked a tribe near Ammal, and stole 1,000 cattle, and 300 sheep from them. Ahmed bin Salem in turn attacked several settlements inhabited by French settlers, and stole their cattle. After hearing about the French army's location, he ambushed general Sylvain Charles Valée's troops, and nearly destroyed their rear before retreating, successfully utilizing Hit-and-run tactics.

Battle of Boudouaou 
The French decided to build several roads towards Kabylia to ease troop movements towards the region. Reorganizing in Thénia, he planned an attack against the French troops guarding the construction workers. The French forces relied on 2 units to guard these roads. In September 1840 Ahmed mobilized his troops and besieged the Qara Mustafa, a few kilometers from Boudouaou. The French administration immediately sent Nicolas Changarnier to lift the siege, and hopefully kill Ahmed bin Salem. Nicolas rallied his troops near El Harrach on September 18 at seven in the evening and set off one and a half hours later to Oued El Hamiz in complete secrecy. The French army arrived at Boudouaou on September 19, and surprised the Algerians, who retreated immediately in disorder. He chased them, and killed several Algerian tribesmen, and seized 200 rifles, albeit he failed to kill Ahmed himself.

Battle of Beni Mered 
The Battle of Beni Mered took place in April 1842 between the French forces and the local Algerian units led by Ahmed himself The French had established a military reserve camp around the town of Beni Mered between Blida and Boufarik.

The Berber horsemen under Ahmed bin Salem extended their operations from the region of Kabylia to the Mitidja Plain in early 1842 by attacking the French forces around the area of Béni Mered. The attack took place on April 11, 1842, not far from the French military reserve camp, against a detachment of 30 French soldiers under the command of Sergent Blandan. About 300 Berber horsemen under Ahmed bin Salem attacked and annihilated the French detachment. The Algerians did not lose a single man.

Battle of Tadmaït 
General Thomas Robert Bugeaud, during April 1844, attempted to launch an expedition to end the Emirate's influence over Kabylia. He planned on defeating Ahmed's forces in the Tadmaït region. Upon meeting his enemy, they fought for 14 hours, but the French units retreated after conceding 32 casualties. Algerian casualties were also heavy.

Battle of Dellys

Battle of Tizi Ouzou (1845)

Nath Irathen campaign

Battle of Beni Jaad

Battle of Issers (1846)

References

1800s births
19th-century deaths
Algerian men
Algerian people
Algerian resistance leaders
Algerian Sunni Muslims
Algerian Sufis
Kabyle people
Year of birth uncertain
Year of death unknown